Marcus Manilius (fl. 1st century AD) was a Roman poet, astrologer, and author of a poem in five books called Astronomica.

The Astronomica

The author of Astronomica is neither quoted nor mentioned by any ancient writer. Even his name is uncertain, but it was probably Marcus Manilius; in the earlier books the author is anonymous, the later give Manilius, Manlius, Mallius. The poem itself implies that the writer lived under Augustus or Tiberius, and that he was a citizen of and resident in Rome, suggesting that Manilius wrote the work during the 20s CE. According to the early 18th century classicist Richard Bentley, he was an Asiatic Greek; according to the 19th-century classicist Fridericus Jacob, an African. His work is one of great learning; he had studied his subject in the best writers, and generally represents the most advanced views of the ancients on astronomy (or rather astrology).

Manilius frequently imitates Lucretius. Although his diction presents some peculiarities, the style is metrically correct, and he could write neat and witty hexameters.

The astrological systems of houses, linking human affairs with the circuit of the zodiac, have evolved over the centuries, but they make their first appearance in Astronomica.  The earliest datable surviving horoscope that uses houses in its interpretation is slightly earlier, . Claudius Ptolemy almost completely ignored houses (templa as Manilius calls them) in his astrological text, Tetrabiblos.

A. E. Housman edition 
The work is also known for being the subject of the most salient of A. E. Housman's scholarly endeavours; his annotated edition he considered his magnum opus, and when the fifth and final volume was published in 1930, 27 years after the first, he remarked he would now "do nothing forever and ever." He nonetheless also thought that it was an  obscure pursuit; to an American correspondent he wrote, "I do not send you a copy, as it would shock you very much; it is so dull that few professed scholars can read it, probably not one in the whole United States." It remains a source of bafflement to many that Housman should have elected to abandon (as they thought) a poet like Propertius in favour of Manilius. For example, the critic Edmund Wilson pondered the countless hours Housman devoted to Manilius and concluded, "Certainly it is the spectacle of a mind of remarkable penetration and vigor, of uncommon sensibility and intensity, condemning itself to duties which prevent it from rising to its full height."  This is, however, to misunderstand the technical task of editing a classical text. In the same vein, Harry Eyres interpreted it as  "what you could see as an act of self-punishment" that so many years were devoted to "a minor Roman versifier whose long didactic poem on astrology must rank as one of the most obscure in the entire annals of poetry".

Honors

An impact crater on the Moon is named after him: Manilius is located in the Mare Vaporum.

References

Editions
 J. R. Bram (ed), Ancient Astrology: Theory and Practice. Matheseos Libri VIII by Firmicus Maternus (Park Ridge, 1975).
 Manilio Il poema degli astri (Astronomica), testo critico a cura di E. Flores, traduzione di Ricardo Scarcia, commento a cura di S. Feraboli e R. Scarcia, 2 vols. (Milano, 1996–2001).
 Wolfgang Hübner (ed.), Manilius, Astronomica, Buch V (2 Bde) (Berlin/New York: De Gruyter, 2010) (Sammlung wissenschaftlicher Commentare).

Further reading
 Colborn, Robert. 2013. "Solving Problems With Acrostics: Manilius Dates Germanicus." Classical Quarterly 63.1: 450–452.	
 Fratantuono, Lee Michael. 2012. "Andromeda, Perseus, and the End of the Astronomica." Maia: rivista di letterature classiche 64.2: 305–315.
 Glauthier, Patrick. 2017. "Repurposing the Stars: Manilius, Astronomica 1, and the Aratean Tradition." American Journal of Philology 138.2: 267–303.
 Goold, G. P. 1961. "A Greek Professorial Circle at Rome." Transactions and Proceedings of the American Philological Association 92: 168–192.
 Green, Steven J. 2014. Disclosure and Discretion in Roman Astrology: Manilius and his Augustan Contemporaries.   Oxford; New York:  Oxford University Press.
 Green, Steven J., and Katharina Volk, eds. 2011. Forgotten Stars: Rediscovering Manilius’ Astronomica. Oxford: Oxford Univ. Press.
 Habinek, Thomas N. 2007. "Probing the Entrails of the Universe: Astrology as Bodily Knowledge in Manilius’ Astronomica." In Ordering Knowledge in the Roman Empire. Edited by Jason König and Tim Whitmarsh, 229–240. Cambridge, UK: Cambridge Univ. Press.
 Komorowska, Joanna. 2016. "Ad Duo Templa Precor: Poetry, Astronomy, and the Authorial Persona in Manilius' Astronomica, I." Eirene 52: 341–358.
 Lapidge, Michael. 1989. "Stoic Cosmology and Roman Literature, First to Third Centuries A.D." Aufstieg und Niedergang der römischen Welt. Edited by Hildegard Temporini and Wolfgang Haase, 1379–1429. Berlin: de Gruyter.
 MacGregor, Alexander. 2004. "Which Art in Heaven: The Sphere of Manilius." Illinois Classical Studies 29: 143–157.
 Neuburg, Matt. 1993. "Hitch Your Wagon to a Star: Manilius and His Two Addressees." In Mega nepios: Il destinatario nell’epos didascalico/The Addressee in Didactic Epic. Edited by Alessandro Schiesaro, Philip Mitsis, and Jenny Strauss Clay, 243–282. Materiali e Discussioni per l’Analisi dei Testi Classici 31. Pisa: Giardini.
 Volk, Katharina. 2009. Manilius and His Intellectual Background. Oxford: Oxford Univ. Press.
 Volk, Katharina. 2002. The Poetics of Latin Didactic: Lucretius, Vergil, Ovid, Manilius. Oxford: Oxford Univ. Press.

External links

The Astronomica of Manilius at The Latin Library
Die Astronomica of Manilius at Opolska Biblioteka Cyfrowa
A. E. Housman's introduction
M. Manilii astronomicon, 5 vols., A. E. Housman (ed.), Londinii, apud Grant Richards, 1903–30, vol. 1,  vol. 2, vol. 3, vol. 4, vol. 5.

Year of birth unknown
Year of death unknown
Ancient Roman astrologers
Silver Age Latin writers
1st-century Roman poets
Manilii